The ASV Zirndorf is a German association football club from Zirndorf, suburb of the city of Nuremberg, Bavaria. Apart from football the club also offers other sports like table tennis and handball. The club's most successful era was in the 1960s when it spent four seasons in the tier three Bayernliga.

History
ASV Zirndorf was formed on 16 April 1946 when five local clubs, TSV 1861 Zirndorf, 1. FC Zirndorf, SpVgg Zindorf, Arbeiter Turn- und Sportverein Jahn and Radfahrverein Solidarität merged. In the early days, the club used the facilities of TSV 1861 but they became a separate club again in August 1948 forcing ASV to move to the former facilities of 1. FC.

ASV Zirndorf was promoted to the northern division of the Bayernliga in 1962 after a title in the 2. Amateurliga Mittelfranken. The club played an impressive first season in this league, finishing runners-up to champions 1. FC Bamberg. Having finished in the top seven they also qualified for the new single division Bayernliga which was introduced at the end of the 1962–63 season.

Zirndorf played the next three seasons in this league, coming seventh in its first season. After this their results declined and in 1966 they were relegated after finishing sixteenth. In the Landesliga Bayern-Mitte, which was also introduced in 1963, the club continued to struggle and was relegated again after another sixteenth place result, this time to the Bezirksliga. In 1972, ASV made a return to the Landesliga for three seasons but was relegated again in 1975. Eleven seasons of lower league football followed before Zirndorf made their way back to Landesliga play in 1986. The club's third stint in the league lasted for another three seasons in which it never finished higher than thirteenth.

Zirndorf entered the Bezirksoberliga Mittelfranken in 1989, a year after the league was formed. Over the next five seasons here the club struggled until again being sent dow to the Bezirksliga in 1995. They bounced back two seasons later and enjoyed five much more successful Bezirksoberliga seasons from 1996 onwards, culminating in a runners-up finish and promotion in 2001.

Back in the Landesliga for a fourth time, after an absence of twelve seasons, ASV spent another four seasons at this level. The first two seasons were promising, with a sixth and a seventh place finish, but then results declined and the club was relegated again in 2005 after coming seventeenth. True to the clubs yo-yo nature it was relegated from the Bezirksoberliga in the following season, too. Four seasons in the Bezirkssliga followed before ASV made another return to the Bezirksoberliga in 2010. They spent the two seasons in the Bezirksoberliga before that circuit was disbanded in 2012.

An eight place finish in the final Bezirksoberliga season was enough for the club to qualify for the new Landesliga Bayern-Nordost after the Landesliga had been expanded from three to five divisions, but Zirndorf finished their campaign in eighteenth place and was again sent down to the Bezirksliga.

Since 2013 the club has been playing in the Bezirksliga Mittelfranken 1.

Honours
The club's honours:

League
 Bayernliga Nord
 Runners-up: 1963
 2. Amateurliga Mittelfranken
 Champions: 1962
 Bezirksoberliga Mittelfranken
 Runners-up: 2001
 Bezirksliga Mittelfranken-Nord
 Champions: 1996
 Runners-up: 2010, 2016
 Bezirksliga Mittelfranken-Süd
 Champions: 1972
 Runners-up: 1968, 1986

Cup
 Mittelfranken Cup
 Winners: 2003

Recent seasons
The recent season-by-season performance of the club:

With the introduction of the Bezirksoberligas in 1988 as the new fifth tier, below the Landesligas (IV), all leagues below dropped one tier. With the introduction of the Regionalligas (III) in 1994 and the 3. Liga in 2008 as the new third tier, below the 2. Bundesliga, all leagues below dropped one tier. With the establishment of the Regionalliga Bayern as the new fourth tier in Bavaria in 2012, the Bayernliga was split into a northern and a southern division, the number of Landesligas expanded from three to five and the Bezirksoberligas abolished. All leagues from the Bezirksligas onwards were elevated one tier.

Key

References

External links 
 Official website of the football department  
 Das deutsche Fußball-Archiv  historical German domestic league tables 
 Manfreds Fussball Archiv  Tables and results from the Bavarian amateur leagues
 ASV Zirndorf at fupa.net 

Football clubs in Germany
Football clubs in Bavaria
Football in Middle Franconia
Association football clubs established in 1946
1946 establishments in Germany
Fürth (district)